The Foreign Affairs and Defense Committee is a permanent Knesset committee which oversees key Foreign and Defense issues of the State of Israel, including the drafting of legislation, supervision over related government ministries and the approval of their budgets. It is regarded as one of two most important Knesset committees (the other being the Finance Committee).

Activity
The majority of the committee's activity takes place in its subcommittees, while the committee as a whole largely serves as a media stage for top defense decision makers. The committee approves extensive subcommittee-drafted delegated legislation in areas of defense, emergency preparedness, emergency recruitment of human resources, Shabak special operations, allocation of emergency equipment, the deployment of the Home Front, and other security and intelligence related tasks. The committee is presented with summaries by the top decision makers in areas of foreign affairs, defense, and intelligence, including by the Prime Minister, the Foreign Affairs Minister, the Minister of Defense, and the heads of Mossad, Shabak, and Aman. The committee's chair, who reports on much of the country's defense activities, is considered one of the most senior figures in the Security Forces and subsequently, it is one of the most sought after positions in the Knesset. The committee's plenary sessions are secret and the meetings of some of its subcommittees are top secret. Consequently, its protocols remain largely unpublished. After repeated instances in which the contents of meetings were leaked, its members became obliged to sign a secrecy affidavit. The media has limited access to committee meetings (at selected occasions) and no access to that of its subcommittees. The government is obligated to bring to the approval of the committee various emergency activities, including ones related to or that are likely to result in war. The committee also undertakes personal hearings for key defense and State decision makers as well as hearings for appreciable defense projects.

During 2020, the Committee took an active role in shaping the legal framework authorizing Shabak to engage in location tracking of coronavirus carriers. Eventually, the committee drafted "the Law on Authorization to Assist in the National Effort to Reduce the Spread of the Novel Coronavirus and to Promote the Use of Civilian Technology to Trace Those Who Have Been in Close Contact with Patients (Temporary Order), 5780-2020", which was enacted by the Knesset on July 21, 2020. Under its provisions, the committee may veto a government declaration to use Shabak for coronavirus contact tracing.

Chairmen

Subcommittees

Subcommittee for Legislation
Subcommittee for Foreign Affairs and Public Diplomacy
Subcommittee for Intelligence and Secret Services
Subcommittee for Personnel in the Israel Defense Forces (IDF)

Subcommittee for Security Perception
Subcommittee for the State of Alert and Field Security
Subcommittee for the Examination of Home-Front Readiness
Subcommittee on Lawfare

Overseen bodies

The Prime Minister's Office, including Mossad and Shabak
The Ministry of Defense, including the IDF, the Malmab (Ministry's security arm), and the military industries and development bodies

The Foreign Ministry
The National Security Council
The Ministry of Public Security and the Police (on security matters)

References

External links
Official site

Legislative branch of Israel
Israeli Security Forces
Foreign relations of Israel
Israel Defense Forces
Committees of the Knesset